The Vela Supercluster (Vela SCl, VSCL) is a massive galactic supercluster about 265.5 megaparsecs (870 million light-years) away within the vicinity of the Zone of Avoidance, centered on the constellation Vela. It is one of the largest structures found in the universe, covering about 25 × 20 degrees of the sky. It consists of two walls: a broad main wall and a secondary merging wall. The combined dimensions of the walls are 115 km/s Mpc on the major dimensions and 90 km/s Mpc on the minor ones, which corresponds to about 385 million and 300 million light years, respectively. About 20 initial galaxy clusters have been identified spectroscopically.

Supercluster
The supercluster's discovery was reported in December 2016 by Kraan-Korteweg et al. through an analysis of the redshifts of 4500 galaxies from the combined data of the 2dF Galaxy Redshift Survey which uses the AAOmega fiber optics from the Anglo-Australian Observatory (AAO), and the South African Large Telescope (SALT).

The supercluster is located in a region obstructed by the view of the Milky Way's disc due to our position inside the disc. This region is known colloquially as the Zone of Avoidance. Hence, the supercluster can only be studied at longer wavelengths (infrared, microwave, radio) which can pass through the gases and dust of the Milky Way disc.

The supercluster is close to the location where the Milky Way, and hence the Solar System, is currently moving toward with respect to the cosmic microwave background, a phenomenon known as the dark flow. This movement was found to be significant relative to the normal Hubble flow of the galaxies caused by the metric expansion of space. Although the Planck spacecraft showed no evidence for this flow, propositions to explain this bulk movement includes the influence of the nearby Shapley Supercluster and the Great Attractor at the center of the Laniakea Supercluster. The Vela Supercluster is estimated to contribute at least  of this bulk movement.

The paper reporting the discovery describes the supercluster as Terra incognita (Latin for "unknown land"), an unknown great continent in the nearby Universe whose outline we are only beginning to discern." More comprehensive surveys in the future, such as the Taipan Galaxy Surveys, are expected to provide additional data about the supercluster.

See also
 CfA2 Great Wall
 Norma Cluster
 Virgo Supercluster
 List of largest cosmic structures

Further reading

References

External links
 
 

Vela (constellation)
Galaxy superclusters
Astronomical objects discovered in 2016